Elkton is a city in Douglas County, Oregon, United States. The population was 195 at the 2010 census, an increase from 147 people in 2000.

History
The Klamath Exploring Expedition founded Elkton around Fort Umpqua, at the mouth of Elk Creek on the Umpqua River, in August 1850. A post office was established at Elkton on September 26, 1851. The settlement became an incorporated city on November 4, 1948.

Geography

Climate
This region experiences warm (but not hot) and dry summers, with no average monthly temperatures above . According to the Köppen Climate Classification system, Elkton has a warm-summer Mediterranean climate, abbreviated Csb on climate maps.

Demographics

As of the census of 2010, there were 195 people, 85 households, and 58 families residing in the city. The racial makeup of the city was 92.3% White, 1% Native American, 2.1% from other races, and 4.6% from two or more races. Hispanic or Latino of any race were 8.7% of the population.

There were 85 households, of which about 24% had children under the age of 18 living with them, 53% were married couples living together, 12% had a female householder with no husband present, 3.5% had a male householder with no wife present, and about 32% were non-families. About 27% of all households were made up of individuals, and 15% had someone living alone who was 65 years of age or older. The average household size was 2.29 and the average family size was 2.78.

The median age in the city was about 52 years. About 22% of residents were under the age of 18; 1% were between the ages of 18 and 24; 19% were from 25 to 44; 30% were from 45 to 64; and 27% were 65 years of age or older. The gender makeup of the city was about 48% male and 52% female.

References

External links
Entry for Elkton in the Oregon Blue Book

Cities in Oregon
Cities in Douglas County, Oregon
1948 establishments in Oregon